Burmbar (alternate names: Banam Bay, Vartavo) is one of the Malakula languages of Vanuatu.

References

Malekula languages
Languages of Vanuatu